Alucita brachyphinus is a moth of the family Alucitidae. It was described by Hering in 1917. It is found in New Guinea.

References

Moths described in 1917
Alucitidae
Moths of New Guinea